Mitchell Graham (born 30 January 1991) is a New Zealand rugby union player who currently plays as a prop for  in New Zealand's domestic Mitre 10 Cup and the  in the international Super Rugby competition.

Early career

Born in the rural Waikato town of Matamata, he was educated at St Peter's School, Cambridge where he played first XV rugby.   During his high school years, he represented  at under-16 level before moving to Christchurch to study chemical engineering at the University of Canterbury.   While in Christchurch, Graham represented  at under-18 and under-21 level.

Senior career

He was again an ever present in the number 1 jersey through 2015 with the Bulls this time faltering at the semi-final stage.

Super Rugby

Graham's form in the loosehead prop position during Taranaki's 2014 title winning season brought him to the attention of Hamilton-based Super Rugby franchise, the Chiefs, who named him as a member of their squad for the 2015 Super Rugby season.   Competing against Jamie Mackintosh and Pauliasi Manu for the number 1 jersey, Graham made an impressive 10 appearances during his debut season in Super Rugby.   He remained a member of the squad through 2016 and with Manu missing the majority of the campaign through injury, Graham was able to establish himself as the Chiefs first-choice loosehead prop, playing 14 times and scoring 1 try.   He was again named in the Chiefs squad for the 2017 Super Rugby season.

Playing for the Chiefs in the 2017 Brisbane Tens Graham fractured the tibia and fibula in his left leg, in a potentially career-ending injury.

Career Honours

Canterbury

Mitre 10 Cup Premiership - 2013

Taranaki

Mitre 10 Cup Premiership - 2014

Statistics

Club

References

1991 births
Living people
New Zealand rugby union players
Rugby union props
Chiefs (rugby union) players
Canterbury rugby union players
Taranaki rugby union players
University of Canterbury alumni
People from Putāruru
People educated at St Peter's School, Cambridge
Rugby union players from Waikato